Ana Catarina Marques Borges (born 15 June 1990) is a Portuguese footballer  who plays for Sporting CP and the Portugal women's national football team. After initially joining on loan from Chelsea, she made the move back to Portugal permanent in July 2017, just before UEFA Women's Euro 2017. She is an important member of the Portugal national team with over 110 caps.

Club career
At the 2015 FA Women's Cup Final, staged at Wembley Stadium for the first time, Borges appeared as a late substitute in Chelsea's 1–0 win over Notts County. It was Chelsea's first major trophy. In October 2015 she was an unused substitute for Chelsea's 4–0 win over Sunderland, which secured the club's first FA WSL title and a League and Cup "double".

In December 2016, Borges renewed her contract with Chelsea but agreed to move on loan to Sporting CP at the same time. On being introduced to the crowd at Estádio José Alvalade, Borges vowed: "I will do everything to help Sporting, the club of my whole life."

Borges was voted the 2017–18 Campeonato Nacional de Futebol Feminino Player of the Season in June 2018.

International career
Borges scored on her debut for the Portugal women's national football team on 4 March 2009, a 2–1 win over Poland at the 2009 Algarve Cup. Two days later Portugal secured another 2–1 win, this time against Wales, and Borges scored again on the occasion of her second cap. She was named by coach Francisco Neto in the 23-player Portugal squad for UEFA Women's Euro 2017 in the Netherlands.

In November 2017 she made her 100th appearance for Portugal in a 2019 FIFA Women's World Cup qualification fixture against Moldova.

International goals

References

External links

Profile at Sporting CP 

1990 births
Living people
Portuguese women's footballers
Portuguese expatriate sportspeople in Spain
Portuguese expatriates in England
Portugal women's international footballers
USL W-League (1995–2015) players
Primera División (women) players
Atlético Madrid Femenino players
Chelsea F.C. Women players
Women's Super League players
Expatriate women's footballers in England
Expatriate women's footballers in Spain
Zaragoza CFF players
People from Gouveia, Portugal
Women's association football wingers
Women's association football forwards
FIFA Century Club
Campeonato Nacional de Futebol Feminino players
Sporting CP (women's football) players
Sportspeople from Guarda District
UEFA Women's Euro 2022 players
UEFA Women's Euro 2017 players
Portuguese expatriate women's footballers
Portuguese expatriate sportspeople in England